This list of photography awards is an index to articles that describe notable awards given for photography. It does not include photojournalism, which is covered in the list of journalism awards. The list is organized by the region and country of the organization that gives the award, but some awards are open to international competitors.

Americas

Asia

Europe

Oceania

See also

 Lists of awards
 List of media awards
 List of journalism awards#Photojournalism

References